Bradley Edward Tandy (born 2 May 1991) is a South African Olympic swimmer. He represented his country at the 2016 Summer Olympics. He competed in the 50 m freestyle event and placed 6th overall with a time of 21.79 seconds. In 2018, Tandy placed third in the 4x100 medley relay at the Commonwealth Games, along with teammates Chad Le Clos, Cameron van der Burgh and Calvyn Justus. At the same event, he won the silver medal for the 50 m freestyle with a time of 21.81 seconds.

Tandy competed in the men's 50 metre freestyle event at the 2020 Summer Olympics. The following year, he won the silver medal in the 50 metre freestyle with a time of 22.49 seconds at the 2022 South Africa National Swimming Championships before retiring.

References

External links
 
 
 
 
 
 
 

1991 births
Living people
South African male swimmers
Swimmers at the 2016 Summer Olympics
Olympic swimmers of South Africa
Swimmers at the 2018 Commonwealth Games
Commonwealth Games medallists in swimming
Commonwealth Games silver medallists for South Africa
Commonwealth Games bronze medallists for South Africa
Swimmers at the 2019 African Games
African Games medalists in swimming
African Games bronze medalists for South Africa
Swimmers at the 2020 Summer Olympics
Medallists at the 2018 Commonwealth Games